is the 26th single by Japanese singer Yōko Oginome. Written by Miyuki Asano and Juichi Morishige, the single was released on July 1, 1992 by Victor Entertainment.

Background and release
The song was used as the ending theme song of the NTV drama series ; Oginome appeared on the episode .

The B-side, "Inochi no Uta", was used as an image song for the 1st Japan Expo Toyama '92.

"Romantic ni Aishite" peaked at No. 28 on Oricon's singles chart and sold over 43,000 copies.

Track listing

Charts

References

External links

1992 singles
Yōko Oginome songs
Japanese-language songs
Japanese television drama theme songs
Victor Entertainment singles